Beatričė Rožinskaitė (born 31 March 1992 in Kaunas, Lithuania) is a Lithuanian former competitive figure skater. She is a three-time Lithuanian national champion.

Competitive highlights

References

 

Lithuanian female single skaters
1992 births
Living people